Dmitri Alekseyevich Makarov (born 16 September 1982) is a former Russian professional footballer.

Club career
He made his professional debut in the Russian Second Division in 2000 for FC Zenit-2 St. Petersburg. He had to retire as player while he was still very young due to serious injury.

Honours
 Russian Premier League runner-up: 2003.
 Russian Premier League Cup winner: 2003.

European club competitions
With FC Zenit St. Petersburg.

 UEFA Cup 2002–03: 2 games, 1 goal.
 UEFA Cup 2004–05: 4 games, 1 goal.

References

1982 births
Footballers from Saint Petersburg
Living people
Russian footballers
Association football forwards
FC Zenit Saint Petersburg players
FC Amkar Perm players
Russian Premier League players
FC Zenit-2 Saint Petersburg players